Girl in a Folk Costume is a painting by the Latvian painter Jānis Tīdemanis from 1930.

Description
The painting is oil on plywood, and has dimensions 59 x 48 centimeters.
The painting belongs to the Latvian National Museum of Art in Riga.

Analysis
The picture depicts a young girl with plaits in a stylized folk costume with bright color on a dark background. The artist uses thick brushstrokes, and large areas of color.

References 

1930 paintings
Latvian paintings
Paintings in Latvia